Grotte Celoni is a station of Line C of the Rome Metro. It is located along the Via Casilina in the Roman district of Grotte Celoni, but it also serves the districts of Tor Bella Monaca and Villaggio Breda. The previous train station of the Rome–Pantano railway line closed in  2008 as part of the renovation and modernisation programme; it was re-opened on 9 November 2014 as part of Line C.

External links

Rome Metro Line C stations
Railway stations opened in 2014
2014 establishments in Italy
Railway stations in Italy opened in the 21st century